The men's sprint at the 2008 Summer Olympics took place on August 17–19 at the Laoshan Velodrome. There were 21 competitors from 15 nations, with each nation limited to two cyclists. The event was won by Chris Hoy of Great Britain, the nation's first victory in the men's sprint and first medal in the event since 1948. He faced his teammate Jason Kenny in the final, the first time since 1984 that one nation had taken the top two spots. Mickaël Bourgain of France earned bronze. Germany's four-Games (five if East Germany before unification is included) podium streak ended.

Background

This was the 24th appearance of the event, which has been held at every Summer Olympics except 1904 and 1912. Three of the quarterfinalists from 2004 returned: gold medalist Ryan Bayley of Australia, silver medalist Theo Bos of the Netherlands, and eighth-place finisher Mickaël Bourgain of France. Bos (the 2004, 2006, and 2007 world champion) and Chris Hoy of Great Britain (the 2008 world champion and gold medalist in keirin and team sprint earlier in the 2008 Games) were the favorites.

The People's Republic of China, Estonia, and Russia each made their debut in the men's sprint. France made its 24th appearance, the only nation to have competed at every appearance of the event.

Qualification

Each National Olympic Committee (NOC) could qualify up to 2 cyclists; there were a total of 21 quota places. Each of the 13 nations qualified for the team sprint could enter one cyclist in the individual sprint. Individuals could also earn qualification through the World Championship, the World Cup, and the "B" World Championship. The top five cyclists on the UCI ranking also qualified.

Competition format

This track cycling event consisted of numerous rounds. The competition began with a flying time trial over 200 metres (the cyclists went around the track 3.5 times, or 875 metres, but only the last 200 metres were timed). All races after the qualifying round consisted of 3 laps of the track (750 metres) but with time recorded only for the final 200 metres. The top 18 cyclists in that qualifying round were seeded into the 1/16 finals. There, they raced one-on-one. The nine winners advanced to the 1/8 finals, while the nine losers were sent to the first repechage. In the repechage, the cyclists were placed in heats of three cyclists apiece; winners moved back into the main competition by advancing into the 1/8 finals.

The twelve cyclists in the 1/8 finals again competed one-on-one. The six winners advanced to the quarterfinals, with the six losers getting another chance at the second repechage. This repechage also consisted of three-cyclist heats, with the two winners moving on to the quarterfinals and the rest of the cyclists competing in a 9th to 12th place classification race.

Beginning with the quarterfinals, the head-to-head competitions switched to a best-of-three format. That format was also used for the semifinals and final. In addition, the bronze medal competition was a best-of-three match between the semifinal losers. The classification race for 5th to 8th places was a single race with all four cyclists competing.

Records

The records for the sprint are 200 metre flying time trial records, kept for the qualifying round in later Games as well as for the finish of races.

Chris Hoy set a new Olympic record of 9.815 seconds in the qualifying round. The next four fastest men also came in under the old record.

Schedule

All times are China Standard Time (UTC+8)

Results

Qualifying round

200 metre time trial, with the top 18 riders advancing.

Round 1

The eighteen qualifying cyclists from the preliminary round were paired, 1 vs. 18, 2 vs. 17, and so on, in head-to-head matches, with the winners advancing to the second round and the losers to the first round repechage.

Heat 1

Heat 2

Heat 3

Heat 4

Heat 5

Heat 6

Heat 7

Heat 8

Heat 9

First repechage

The nine losers from the first round were put into three three-man matches, with the winner of each advancing to the next round.

First repechage heat 1

First repechage heat 2

First repechage heat 3

1/8 finals

The twelve cyclists who qualified this far were paired off again in head-to-head sprint matches.

1/8 final 1

1/8 final 2

1/8 final 3

1/8 final 4

1/8 final 5

1/8 final 6

Second repechage

The six cyclists who lost in the second round were matched into two three-man races, with the winner of each advancing to the next round.

Second repechage heat 1

Second repechage heat 2

Quarterfinals

The eight cyclists qualified this far were paired for a best two-out-of-three series of 200 metre races. None of the pairings required a third race.

Quarterfinal 1

Quarterfinal 2

Quarterfinal 3

Quarterfinal 4

Semifinals

The four cyclists qualified this far were paired again for a best two-out-of-three series of races.

Semifinal 1

Semifinal 2

Finals

The winners from the semifinals were paired to race for gold and silver, and the losers from that round raced for bronze. Each match was again the best two-out-of-three races.

9th—12th place classification race

During the same session as the semifinals, the four cyclists who were eliminated in the second round repechage were put into a single four-man race to determine exact placings from ninth to twelfth.

5th—8th place classification race

In the same session as the finals, the four cyclists who lost in the quarterfinals were put into one four-man 200 metre race to determine exact placings from fifth to eighth.

Bronze medal match

Gold medal match

Final classification

References

Track cycling at the 2008 Summer Olympics
Cycling at the Summer Olympics – Men's sprint
Men's events at the 2008 Summer Olympics